Wesley Eugene Cantrell (born September 12, 1961) is an American politician. He is a member of the Georgia House of Representatives from the 22nd District, serving since 2015. Cantrell has sponsored 96 bills. He is a member of the Republican party.

References

Republican Party members of the Georgia House of Representatives
Politicians from Augusta, Georgia
21st-century American politicians
Living people
1961 births